George Blinn Francis (August 12, 1883 – May 20, 1967) was a U.S. Representative from New York.

Born in Cranston, Rhode Island, Francis attended the University School in Providence, Rhode Island.
He graduated from Brown University, Providence, Rhode Island, in 1904 and from Harvard Law School in 1907.
He was admitted to the bar in 1907 and commenced practice in New York City.

Francis was elected as a Republican to the Sixty-fifth Congress (March 4, 1917 – March 3, 1919).
He was not a candidate for renomination in 1918.
He resumed the practice of law in New York City.
He was special assistant United States attorney in Minnesota in 1926 and 1927.

Francis was elected a member of the board of water commissioners of Tarrytown, New York, and served as its president.
He retired in October 1953 and resided at Delray Beach, Florida.
He died May 20, 1967, in Boca Raton, Florida.
He was interred in Green-Wood Cemetery, Brooklyn, New York.

References

1883 births
1967 deaths
Brown University alumni
Harvard Law School alumni
New York (state) lawyers
Burials at Green-Wood Cemetery
People from Delray Beach, Florida
Republican Party members of the United States House of Representatives from New York (state)
20th-century American politicians
20th-century American lawyers